The 1998 All-Ireland Senior Camogie Championship Final was the 67th All-Ireland Final and the deciding match of the 1998 All-Ireland Senior Camogie Championship, an inter-county camogie tournament for the top teams in Ireland.

This was the first-ever Bord na Gaeilge All-Ireland Senior Camogie Final to be broadcast live on RTÉ television. Irene O'Keeffe scored both goals as Cork won.

References

All-Ireland Senior Camogie Championship Final
All-Ireland Senior Camogie Championship Final
All-Ireland Senior Camogie Championship Final, 1998
All-Ireland Senior Camogie Championship Finals
Cork county camogie team matches